Ruriana Chak No. 31 RB is a neighboring village of Sangla Hill, Nankana Sahib district, Pakistan.

Economy
Farming is the main source of income for the village. Some seek employment abroad.

Education
 Govt. Islah e Millat High School
 Govt. Primary School
 Govt. Girl's Middle School
 Sir Syed Model School

Some students have gone to Lahore and Faisalabad for their higher education.

Health
No health facilities are available in the village, though a new animal hospital has opened.

References

Populated places in Nankana Sahib District